Matthew Brandyn Wolff (born April 14, 1999) is an American professional golfer. He was an NCAA All-American at Oklahoma State University, and won the 2019 NCAA Division I individual championship. Wolff picked up his first win on the PGA Tour at the 2019 3M Open. He joined LIV Golf in 2022.

Early life and amateur career
Wolff was born on April 14, 1999 in Simi Valley, California to Bill and Shari Wolff. He grew up in a Jewish family, but converted to Christianity during his time in college. He stated in 2019: "To put my identity in Christ and know that there's a lot more to me than just a golfer, it took the pressure away from golf". Wolff was raised in Agoura Hills, California, started playing junior golf at the Lake Lindero Country Club's Lindero Kids Summer Sports Camp and attended Westlake High School. He finished runner-up at the 2017 U.S. Junior Amateur Golf Championship. After initially committing to play college golf for the University of Southern California, Wolff withdrew his commitment to attend Oklahoma State. In his first year, he earned four runners-up, first-team All-American honors, and the Phil Mickelson Award as the nation's top freshman. He also made the putt to clinch the 2018 NCAA Division I Championship for Oklahoma State. While attending Oklahoma State University, Wolff was also a part of the Phi Gamma Delta (FIJI) fraternity. 

Wolff began his sophomore season with back-to-back stroke play titles at the Carmel Cup and the OFCC Fighting Illini Invitational, which he followed up by sharing medalist honors at the Royal Oaks Intercollegiate. The three consecutive wins brought Wolff to the top of the college rankings. He made his PGA Tour debut at the 2019 Waste Management Phoenix Open after receiving a sponsor's exemption.

In addition to his results, Wolff's unorthodox golf swing has drawn attention. To get more rotation, he employs a left leg kick that he picked up from playing baseball, and uses the ground to create power.

Professional career
Wolff turned professional in June 2019 and made his professional debut at the Travelers Championship.

On July 7, 2019, Wolff earned his first PGA Tour victory at the 3M Open at TPC Twin Cities in Blaine, Minnesota, where he returned a six-under par 65 in the final round to edge out Collin Morikawa and Bryson DeChambeau by one stroke at 21-under par overall. The tournament went to the final green, as DeChambeau, playing one group ahead of Morikawa and Wolff, made an eagle on the par-5 18th hole to leapfrog them both and take a 1-stroke lead. Wolff then hit his approach onto the edge of the green, 26 feet from the hole; he made the putt for eagle to retake the lead, and when Morikawa failed to make his putt to tie, the victory belonged to Wolff. The victory gave Wolff a two-year PGA Tour exemption, in addition to $1.152 million in prize money. Wolff was the first player since Billy Hurley III in 2016 to win after receiving a sponsor exemption. He was also only the third player to win an NCAA title and PGA Tour event in the same calendar year, joining Tiger Woods and Ben Crenshaw.

In August 2020, Wolff finished in a tie for fourth place at the PGA Championship, his first major championship appearance, after a final-round 65 (five-under par). Six weeks later, in September, he led the U.S. Open at Winged Foot by two strokes heading into the final day after returning a third-round score of 65 (five-under par), the joint lowest round of the tournament. A final round of 75 (five-over par) saw him finish as runner-up, six strokes behind winner Bryson DeChambeau. His second top-five finish from his first two major championships earned him $1,350,000.

In June 2022, Wolff joined LIV Golf, and was subsequently suspended by the PGA Tour after playing in his first event. He has recorded three top-10s since his LIV Golf debut, most notably finishing tied for second in Bedminster, two shots behind winner Henrik Stenson.

Amateur wins
2018 The Carmel Cup, OFCC Fighting Illini Invite, Royal Oaks Intercollegiate
2019 The Amer Ari Invitational, Valspar Collegiate, NCAA Division I individual championship

Source:

Professional wins (1)

PGA Tour wins (1)

PGA Tour playoff record (0–1)

Results in major championships
Results not in chronological order in 2020.

DQ = disqualified
CUT = missed the half-way cut
"T" = tied
NT = No tournament due to COVID-19 pandemic

Results in The Players Championship

CUT = missed the halfway cut

Results in World Golf Championships

1Cancelled due to COVID-19 pandemic

NT = No tournament
"T" = Tied
WD = withdrew
Note that the Championship and Invitational were discontinued from 2022.

U.S. national team appearances
Amateur
Palmer Cup: 2018 (winners)

References

External links
 
 
 Profile on Oklahoma State's official athletic site

American male golfers
Oklahoma State Cowboys golfers
PGA Tour golfers
LIV Golf players
Jewish golfers
Golfers from California
Jewish American sportspeople
Sportspeople from Los Angeles County, California
People from Simi Valley, California
People from Agoura Hills, California
1999 births
Living people
21st-century American Jews